State Route 610 (SR 610) is a state highway in Clark County, Nevada. It comprises a small portion of Lamb Boulevard in the northeastern Las Vegas Valley.

Route description

State Route 610 begins at the intersection of Las Vegas Boulevard North (SR 604) and Lamb Boulevard in the unincorporated township of Sunrise Manor. From there, it follows Lamb Boulevard northward, passing through mostly residential neighborhoods. The route eventually enters the city of North Las Vegas and passes by some industrial businesses. The SR 610 designation ends at the Lamb Boulevard interchange with Interstate 15 (I-15) and U.S. Route 93 (US 93).

History
By 1968, the I-15 under construction in Nevada had a terminus at the Lamb Boulevard interchange. Freeway traffic to the north of Las Vegas transitioned from the Interstate to the old highways on Las Vegas Boulevard (U.S. Routes 91 and 93) by way of Lamb Boulevard. The Interstate access along Lamb Boulevard was no longer a major through movement by 1972, as I-15 was completed further south into the urban core of Las Vegas by that time.

SR 610 was established in the 1976 renumbering of Nevada's state highways. The route was designated on July 1, 1976.

Major intersections

Note: "Sunrise Manor" is an unincorporated community in the urban Las Vegas area.

Public transport
RTC Transit Route 203 functions on this road.

See also

References

610
Streets in the Las Vegas Valley
Transportation in Clark County, Nevada
Sunrise Manor, Nevada
North Las Vegas, Nevada